San Miguel Arcangel Parish is the Catholic church and parish house of the people of Atitalaquia. Has always belonged to the Diocese of Tula in Mexico.

References 

1609 establishments in North America
Spanish Colonial architecture in Mexico
Roman Catholic churches in Mexico
Franciscan churches in Mexico
Spanish Catholic Evangelisation in Teotlalpan